This is a list of programs currently or formerly broadcast on Sky News Australia. Note that this list does not include programming on sister and defunct channels such as Your Money, Sky News Business Channel, Sky News Weather or Sky News Extra.

Current original programming

Current acquired programming

Former programming

Notes
Debuted as a short run series for the 2013 election ending 31 August 2013, and relaunched on 30 April 2016 ahead of the 2016 election before ending again.

References

Sky News Australia
Lists of television series by network